Southend Airport railway station is on the Shenfield to Southend Line in the East of England, serving London Southend Airport, the village of Sutton and northern parts of Southend-on-Sea. Train services provide an airport rail link between Southend Airport and Central London.

The station is managed by London Southend Airport but the trains serving it are operated by Greater Anglia. The Engineer's Line Reference for the line is SSV; the station's three-letter station code is SIA. The platforms have an operational length for 12-coach trains.

History
When Southend Airport officially opened as a municipal airport in 1935, the mayor of Southend suggested that it would be a good idea to open a railway station to serve the airport. After Southend Borough Council sold the airport to Regional Airports Ltd, a scheme was proposed in 1997 to build a station, and planning permission was obtained from Rochford District Council. It was not until 2008 that the Stobart group began to advance the project, and construction began in late 2009. The station was originally planned to open in 2009, but the opening date was postponed several times. In June 2011, National Express trains began stopping at the station, but passengers were not permitted to get off.

The station was designed by Atkins and constructed by Birse Rail; it was opened by the Transport Minister Theresa Villiers in 2011. A new terminal building adjoining the station opened in 2012.

Services 
The typical Monday-Saturday off-peak service is:
 2 trains per hour (tph) to London Liverpool Street, calling at all stations to  then  and Liverpool Street.
 1 tph to London Liverpool Street, calling at all stations to Shenfield then , Stratford and Liverpool Street.

When the Crossrail project is completed in 2023, interchange will be possible at Shenfield, Stratford and Liverpool Street between Southend Airport rail services and the new Elizabeth line, providing onward links to central London and Heathrow Airport. Glyn Jones, chief executive of Stobart Aviation, proposed in 2018 that Crossrail should be extended to Southend Airport to alleviate capacity problems at Heathrow.

References

External links 

Transport in Rochford District
Railway stations in Essex
Railway stations opened by Network Rail
Railway stations in Great Britain opened in 2011
Greater Anglia franchise railway stations
Airport railway stations in the United Kingdom